Edward Samuel Rogers III (born June 22, 1969) is a Canadian businessman who serves as the chairman of Rogers Communications. He is also the chairman of the Rogers Control Trust, which controls the majority of the voting shares of Rogers Communications.

Early life and family 
Like his father and grandfather, Rogers attended Upper Canada College in Toronto. He subsequently attended the University of Western Ontario and graduated with a Bachelor of Arts degree. Rogers then worked for Comcast Corporation in the Philadelphia area from 1993 to 1996 before returning to Canada to work at his family's company.

Rogers and his wife Suzanne have three children – Chloé, Edward and Jack – and they live in Toronto. He is a descendant of Timothy Rogers (1756–1834), a Quaker leader who founded Newmarket and Pickering in what is now Ontario.

Career 
Rogers is the chairman of the board of directors of Rogers Communications Inc. and also chairman of its Finance Committee, Nominating Committee, and Executive Committee. He is chairman of Rogers Bank and of the Toronto Blue Jays baseball club, and a director of Maple Leaf Sports & Entertainment and CableLabs. Rogers is a director of the Hospital for Sick Children Foundation and the ONEXONE Foundation.

From March 1996 until November 1998, Rogers was vice president and general manager of paging, data and emerging technologies for Rogers Wireless. His accomplishments at Rogers Wireless included increasing the profitability of the paging division and the launch of wireless data. Prior to that, he served as Director of Sales for Rogers Cable Inc., where he was responsible for retail, audit sales and sales administration.

From November 1998 until September 2000, he was the vice president and general manager of the Toronto region, representing 850,000 customers for Rogers Cable Inc. In this capacity, he was responsible for financial performance, sales performance and customer satisfaction. His responsibilities included sales, marketing, customer communications, call centre operations and technical operations.

From October 2000 until December 2002, he was Senior Vice President, Planning and Strategy, for Rogers Communications Inc. In this capacity, he was responsible for directing and co-ordinating strategic planning and budgeting.

From January 2003 to September 2009, he was President and Chief Executive Officer of Rogers Cable Inc., which consists of three business units. Rogers Cable is Canada's largest cable company offering cable television, high-speed Internet access and residential telephony services. Rogers Business Solutions division is a national provider of voice communications services, data networking and broadband Internet connectivity to small, medium and large businesses across the country. Rogers Retail is one of the largest retail chains in Canada with more than 475 stores. In 2009, Rogers Cable generated over $3.8 billion in revenue, over $1.3 billion in EBITDA and had over 14,000 employees.

Under his leadership, Rogers Cable's EBITDA more than doubled. Free cash flow saw an over $800M improvement and in 2009 the company produced nearly $500M in free cash flow. At the end of his tenure, Rogers Cable led the Canadian cable industry in RGU penetration and ARPU per customer.

On October 21, 2021, Rogers was removed as chairman of Rogers Communications Inc.  He was reinstated as chairman by order of the British Columbia Supreme Court on November 5, 2021.

References

External links 
 Rogers Communications Inc. – Board of Directors

1969 births
Living people
Canadian chief executives
Canadian philanthropists
Businesspeople from Toronto
University of Western Ontario alumni
Rogers Communications
Maple Leaf Sports & Entertainment